The Mehr! Theater am Großmarkt (or simply Mehr! Theater) is a multi-purpose event venue in Hamburg, Germany. It was built into the Großmarkthalle, which is a protected historic building constructed by architect Bernhard Hermkes in 1962. With a capacity of 3,500 people, it is the biggest theater in Hamburg and hosted several entertainment events since its opening in March 2015.

Background 
The Mehr! Theater opened on May 7, 2015 with a concert of the London Symphony Orchestra. Operator of the venue is the Düsseldorf-based company Mehr-BB Entertainment GmbH, with Maik Klokow being the manager. Since its opening in March 2015, the venue hosted several concerts and musicals, including performances by singers Sufjan Stevens, Kylie Minogue Iggy Pop, British band Editors and musicals such as Dirty Dancing and We Will Rock You. As of 2015, more than 170,000 people attended 100 concerts, shows and musicals.

The German version of Harry Potter and the Cursed Child was supposed to open on March 15, 2020 in The Mehr! Theater. Due to the COVID-19 pandemic the premiere was delayed several times and finally took place on December 5, 2021.

Gallery

References

Theatres in Hamburg
Buildings and structures completed in 1962
Theatres completed in 2015
2015 establishments in Germany
Buildings and structures in Hamburg-Mitte